The World/American Greco-Roman Heavyweight Championship and the World/European Greco-Roman Heavyweight Championship was a Greco-Roman professional wrestling championship contested for throughout the continent of Australia, Europe and North America.The title existed from 1875 through approximately 1937.

The final champion Georg Hackenschmidt defeated American Heavyweight Champion, Tom Jenkins, on May 5, 1905 in New York City, New York to unify both titles and become the undisputed World Heavyweight Champion.

World/American Greco-Roman Heavyweight Championship Title history

World/European Greco-Roman Heavyweight Championship Title history

See also
American Heavyweight Championship
Early wrestling championships
European Heavyweight Championship
World Catch-as-Catch-Can Championship
List of early world heavyweight champions in professional wrestling

References

External links
World/American Greco-Roman Heavyweight Title at wrestling-titles.com
World/European Greco-Roman Heavyweight Title at wrestling-titles.com

World heavyweight wrestling championships
Greco-Roman wrestling